Fülöp Jakab "Kóbi" Kauser (22 March 1878 in Budapest – 27 June 1925 in Budapest) was a Hungarian track and field athlete who competed at the 1900 Summer Olympics in Paris. He participated in the pole vault competition and finished fourth.

References

External links 

profile 

1878 births
1925 deaths
Athletes from Budapest
Hungarian male pole vaulters
Athletes (track and field) at the 1900 Summer Olympics
Olympic athletes of Hungary